Mina is a census-designated place in Mineral County in west-central Nevada, United States. The 2010 population was 155.

History

Mina was founded as a railroad town in 1905 and was named for Ferminia Sarras, a large landowner and famed prospector known as the 'Copper Queen.' The Carson and Colorado Railway, a division of Southern Pacific Railroad, had a station in the town. The railroad is long gone – the last section between Thorne and Mina shut down in 1985 –, but at one time a local shuttle called the "Slim Princess" allowed Native Americans to ride free of charge atop the railcars, and passengers and crew would shoot wild game from open windows. The train moved slowly enough that hunters were able to retrieve their game and reboard.

Gee Jon and Hughie Sing were convicted of the August 27, 1921, Mina, Nevada murder of Tom Quong Kee. Gee Jon, a 29-year-old member of the Hop Sing Tong, became the first person to be executed by lethal gas. The execution was at the Nevada State Prison on February 8, 1924.

Name
Some sources state that the name is derived from the Spanish word meaning 'mine.'
Other sources state that John C. Fulton (or John M. Fulton), division general manager for the Southern Pacific Railway, named the town after Fermina Sarras (or Sarrias), a Nicaraguan woman who was operating nearby copper prospects.

Initially a railroad station was intended to be at Sodaville, but agreement between the railroad and land speculators could not be reached, so Mina, Nevada, was platted two miles north of Sodaville.

Geography

Climate
The Köppen Climate System classifies the weather in this area as semi-arid, abbreviated BSk.  This climate type occurs primarily on the periphery of true deserts in low-latitude semiarid steppe regions.

Demographics

References

External links
 Wild Burros of Mina, Nevada

1905 establishments in Nevada
Census-designated places in Mineral County, Nevada
Populated places established in 1905